Siona Shimshi (also "Ziona"; ; July 14, 1939 – October 16, 2018) was an Israeli painter, sculptor, ceramist, and textile designer.

Early life
Shimshi was born in Tel Aviv, to Haya Rivka (Kuklanski) and Avraham Shimshi, who had immigrated to Mandate Palestine from Lithuania in 1933. She married Jachin Hirsch, an Israeli filmmaker, in 1961.

She studied at the Avni Institute in Tel Aviv from 1956 to 1959, with Avigdor Stematsky, Yehezkel Streichman, and Moshe Mokady. She also studied ceramics at Alfred University in New York, from 1959 to 1962, as well as at Greenwich House Pottery in New York City.

Art career
In 1965, she was a co-founder of a group of artists called the "10+ Group", along with artists Buky Schwartz, Raffi Lavie, and others.

Shimshi was head of the Ceramic Design Department and taught as a professor at the Bezalel Academy of Art and Design in Jerusalem, from 1979 to 1987. In 1979, she designed the set for a performance of A Simple Story by Shmuel Yosef Agnon for the Habimah Theater in Tel Aviv.

In 1993–94, she was the curator of an exhibition of Dora Gad, in the Tel Aviv Museum of Art.

Among her creations are a work in wood that is exhibited in the King David Hotel in Jerusalem, a wall hanging at the Tel Aviv Hilton, a 1998 sculpture for Israel's 50th anniversary that is exhibited in Holon, glass walls at Kennedy Airport in New York City, and a 2004 portrait painting of Natan Alterman that appears on the facade of Tel Aviv City Hall.

Awards
Shimshi was awarded the 1988 Arie El Hanani Prize by the Joshua Rabinowitz Foundation for Arts, for her sculpture in Goren Goldstein Park in Tel Aviv.

Death
Shimshi died in Tel Aviv on October 16, 2018 at the age of 79. She was buried at Yarkon Cemetery.

See also
Israeli ceramics

References

External links
Siona Shimshi website
Siona Shimshi, ציונה שמשי, Julie M. Gallery (1990)

1939 births
2018 deaths
20th-century Israeli women artists
21st-century Israeli women artists
20th-century ceramists
21st-century ceramists
20th-century Israeli sculptors
Textile designers
Artists from Tel Aviv
Israeli people of Lithuanian-Jewish descent
Alfred University alumni
Academic staff of Bezalel Academy of Arts and Design
Israeli women painters
Israeli women sculptors
Israeli women ceramists
Israeli portrait painters
Burials at Yarkon Cemetery
Israeli women curators